The Ordnance Survey Great Britain County Series maps were produced from the 1840s to the 1890s by the Ordnance Survey, with revisions published until the 1940s. The series mapped the counties of Great Britain at both a six inch and twenty-five inch scale with accompanying acreage and land use information. Following the introduction of the Ordnance Survey National Grid in the 1930s the County Series maps were replaced by a new series of maps at each scale.

History
The Ordnance Survey began producing six inch to the mile (1:10,560) maps of Great Britain in the 1840s, modelled on its first large-scale maps of Ireland from the mid-1830s. This was partly in response to the Tithe Commutation Act 1836 which led to calls for a large-scale survey of England and Wales.

From 1854, to meet requirements for greater detail, including land-parcel numbers in rural areas and accompanying information, cultivated and inhabited areas were mapped at 1:2500 (25.344 inches to the mile), at first parish by parish, with blank space beyond the parish boundary, and later continuously. Early copies of 1:2500 maps were available hand-coloured. Up to 1879 the 1:2500 maps were accompanied by Books of Reference or "area books" that gave acreages and land-use information for land-parcel numbers. After 1879, land-use information was dropped from these area books; after the mid-1880s, the books themselves were dropped and acreages were printed instead on the maps. After 1854, the six-inch maps and their revisions were based on the twenty-five inch maps.

The six-inch sheets covered an area of six by four miles on the ground; the twenty-five inch sheets an area of one by one and a half. One square inch on the twenty-five inch maps was roughly equal to an acre on the ground. In later editions the six-inch sheets were published in "quarters" (NW, NE, SW, SE), each covering an area of three by two miles on the ground. 

The first edition of the two scales was completed by the 1890s. A second edition (or "first revision") was begun in 1891 and completed just before the First World War. From 1907 till the early 1940s, a third edition (or "second revision") was begun but never completed: only areas with significant changes on the ground were revised, many two or three times.

From the late 19th century to the early 1940s, the OS produced many "restricted" versions of the County Series maps and other War Department sheets for War Office purposes, in a variety of large scales that included details of military significance such as dockyards, naval installations, fortifications and military camps. Apart from a brief period during the disarmament talks of the 1930s, these areas were left blank or incomplete on standard maps. The de-classified sheets have now been deposited in some of the Copyright Libraries, helping to complete the map-picture of pre-Second World War Britain.

Coverage
Both the 6 inch and 25 inch scale Ordnance Survey maps of Great Britain showed the boundaries of:
Counties
Divisions of counties, ridings and quarter sessional divisions
Parliamentary divisions of counties
Hundreds/wapentakes/wards (until 1879)
Mother or ancient parishes (until 1879)
Civil parishes or townships
Parliamentary boroughs
Municipal boroughs
Municipal wards
Police burghs (Scotland)
County boroughs
Parliamentary divisions of county boroughs
Wards of corporate towns
Liberties, honours etc.
Urban sanitary or local board districts
Poor law unions
Divisions of townships (until 1879)
Subdivisions of townships (until 1879)
Registrar's and Superintendent registrar's districts (Lancashire & Yorkshire only)

The maps included the area of most civil parishes and their detached parts, as well as extra-parochial areas and townships. Originally the area of these places was given in acres, roods and perches. After about 1879 this was changed to solely acres, with area given to three decimal places. As boundary changes occurred throughout the late 19th century, reprints of map sheets would be updated with annotations detailing these changes.

6 inches to the mile (1:10,560)

England

Scotland

Wales

25.344 inches to the mile (1:2,500)
16 25.344" sheets = 1 6" sheet
100 5' sheets = 1 6" sheet

Ordnance Survey Town Plans

5 feet to the mile (1:1,056)

10 feet to the mile (1:528)

10.56 feet to the mile (1:500)

London Index map 1 London Index map 2
London Index map

References

Ordnance Survey
Cartography
Geography of the United Kingdom
Maps of the United Kingdom